Two destroyers of the Soviet Navy have been named Slavny:
 Slavny, a Storozhevoy-class destroyer launched in 1939
 Slavny, a Mod Kashin-class destroyer launched in 1965

Soviet Navy ship names